Rozhdestvenka is a rural locality (a selo) in Batayevsky Selsoviet of Akhtubinsky District, Astrakhan Oblast, Russia. The population was 5 as of 2010.

Geography 
It is located 20 km south-east from Akhtubinsk.

References 

Rural localities in Akhtubinsky District